Raphael Falk can refer to either:

Raphael Falk (chess player) (1856–1913), a Russian chess master
Raphael Falk (geneticist) (1929–2019), a German-born Israeli geneticist